The 1871 Atlantic hurricane season lasted from mid-summer to late-fall. Records show that 1871 featured two tropical storms, four hurricanes and two major hurricanes (Category 3+). However, in the absence of modern satellite and other remote-sensing technologies, only storms that affected populated land areas or encountered ships at sea were recorded, so the actual total could be higher. According to a study in 2004, an undercount bias of zero to six tropical cyclones per year between 1851 and 1885 and zero to four per year between 1886 and 1910 is possible. A later study in 2008 estimated that eight or more storms may have been missed prior to 1878.

Of the known 1871 cyclones, both Hurricane Five and Hurricane Eight were first documented in 1995 by José Fernández-Partagás and Henry Díaz, who also proposed large changes to the known tracks of Hurricane Three and of Hurricane Four. Further analysis, in 2008, extended the duration of both Hurricane Three and Hurricane Seven, by one day each. A reanalysis published in 2014 found fifteen named storms, twelve of which became hurricanes; four attained major hurricane status. However, these results have yet to be officially accepted into HURDAT.



Timeline

Systems

Tropical Storm One 

For the next twelve hours, the system moved westward over the Straits of Florida between Cuba and the lower Florida Keys. Entering the southeastern Gulf of Mexico, the cyclone turned to the northwest and strengthened. Afterward, the system gradually turned to the west-northwest and maintained its intensity. As it neared the Texas coast, its course shifted to the northwest. After landfall, the storm curved northward over East Texas, and dissipated over eastern Oklahoma late on June 5. A preliminary reanalysis in 2014 upgraded the cyclone to a Category 1 hurricane at landfall in Texas.

Storm surge flooded onto and eroded Galveston Island, causing washouts of railroad beds and structures. One vessel, the steamship Alabama, beached at Galveston, while another, the Virginia Dare, grounded on an offshore sandbar there. Four drownings occurred at Galveston. Gale-force winds also affected Port Aransas; very high tides occurred there and at Indianola, flooding low ground at the latter place. Extremely heavy rains associated with this cyclone also caused flooding in New Orleans, which was reportedly "submerged". The New York Times on June 6 reported that floodwaters covered , five hundred blocks in all.

Tropical Storm Two 

Taking a steady course to the northwest, the cyclone closely followed its predecessor, threatening Southeast Texas yet again. After landfall, the system headed northward over the western part of Galveston Bay. Late on June 10, the cyclone dissipated over East Texas, just south of the Texas–Oklahoma border.

As it affected Galveston, the storm destroyed a church and many houses. Storm surge occurred on the island for the second time in a week, as floodwaters engulfed the eastern section of Galveston Island. Several ships wrecked as well, and some sailing ships were deemed lost at sea. A cotton steamship, the Mollie Hambleton, sank while at anchor. One person died at Refugio, when winds unroofed a church. Storm surge-related flooding was minimal at Indianola. Strong gales affected coastal Louisiana, and neared hurricane intensity at Lake Charles, downing fruit trees. Torrential rain damaged corn and cotton crops, and numerous cattle drowned. A tornado struck Chatawa, Mississippi, destroying a schoolhouse and trees.

A reanalysis in 2014 tentatively determined that this storm and the preceding system were a single hurricane.

Hurricane Three 

Early on August 14, a report from the ship Tybee of hurricane-force winds to the east of The Bahamas signaled the presence of a well-formed system. Tracking generally westward, the hurricane gradually strengthened. At 12:00 UTC on August 15, the cyclone attained peak winds of —equivalent to Category 3 status on the modern Saffir–Simpson scale, which it maintained until landfall in Florida. Several hours later, the hurricane made landfall over the northern Abaco Islands, and continued westward toward the Gulf Stream. As it neared eastern Florida, the storm curved slightly west-northwestward, before making landfall north of Hobe Sound at 02:00 UTC on August 17.

Over the next few days, the cyclone parabolically turned to the northeast, re-entering the Atlantic Ocean near Darien, Georgia, on August 18. While executing a clockwise loop off the Southeastern United States, the system maintained winds just below hurricane intensity. On August 22, the system ended its loop and headed westward, toward the Georgia coast. Final landfall occurred near Brunswick at 00:00 UTC on August 23. The system decayed as it moved inland, and dissipation took place eighteen hours later.

Despite crossing The Bahamas at peak strength, damage in the archipelago, if any, is unknown. The hurricane was of great extent as it struck Florida, with hurricane-force winds occurring at New Smyrna— from the eye. The local U.S. Army Signal Corps observer judged the storm to be the worst since October 23, 1865. In New Smyrna, the storm snapped or otherwise damaged oak and citrus trees. At Enterprise, several homes were unroofed as well. Winds destroyed another home at Ocala. Numerous ships were tossed ashore, leaving the beaches "strewn with wrecks". Impacts to Georgia, if any, are unknown.

Hurricane Four 

1871 Santa Juana Hurricane

The system progressed on a west-northwest track and steadily intensified, becoming a major hurricane at 00:00 UTC on August 21. The eye passed directly over the island of Saba on 21 August 1871 at 10:00am, and the hurricane was described by the resident Catholic priest, Father Koch. "On the 21st August 1871 a devastating hurricane swept over this island. The first indications of the approach of a storm was observed during the preceding night. Marine Cumulus [storm clouds] were seen forming in the N.E. portion of the sky. Each gush of wind succeeded one another with increasing force. At half past four in the morning every one got alarmed. The barometer reading at 29.5 indicating that the storm was about 350 in distance. The clouds were moving with accelerating force towards the island. The sky was ? with a gloomy appearance, the rain commenced to fall with interruption at about 9 o'clock it burst forth with all terror. The noise was at that time terrifying. The [thatch] houses were already leveled one after the other, and the sky was covered with the debris of these and houses. Every one thought at that moment and hence awaiting of their general destruction. At about 10 o'clock the wind shifted. Then it was a dead silence. The nucleus was passing over the island. Then it began departing from the southwest all the force...".
The hurricane then weakened to a Category 2 hurricane, maintaining this strength while making further landfalls in The Bahamas. After crossing Central Florida, it entered the Gulf of Mexico and made a final landfall on Taylor County, Florida, as a tropical storm. The storm then moved north and east over land, weakening into a tropical depression, before strengthening back into a tropical storm after re-emerging into the Atlantic off South Carolina.

The hurricane caused numerous shipwrecks, including three ships lost at Puerto Rico, and left 27 people dead at St. Thomas.

Hurricane Five 

Hurricane Five maintained this intensity until it was last observed south of Nova Scotia. It is possible that the storm made landfall on Nova Scotia and it is also possible that the storm formed before August 30.

Hurricane Six 

A hurricane formed near the geographic center of the Gulf of Mexico on September 5. At 14:00 UTC the next day, it made landfall near Cedar Key, Florida, as a Category 1 hurricane. It brought heavy rainfall to Florida and Georgia before entering the Atlantic off the east coast of Georgia. Still continuing to the northeast, it was last sighted south of Cape Hatteras.

Hurricane Seven 

A tropical storm was first sighted in the Bay of Campeche on September 30. It continued moving in a northeast direction, paralleling the Texas coast and strengthening to a Category 1 hurricane while doing so. Early on October 4, the hurricane passed south of the Mississippi River Delta. After re-entering the Atlantic Ocean, the storm was last sighted east of Cape Hatteras. At least three people were killed at Galveston and several ships were wrecked or foundered, some with the loss of all hands.

Hurricane Eight 

A hurricane was first observed northeast of the British Virgin Islands on the morning of October 10. Its intensity remained steady at that level as it traveled first west, then veered north before travelling parallel to the US coast. The hurricane dissipated shortly after making landfall at Nova Scotia on October 13.

Seasonal effects 
This is a table of the storms in 1871 and their landfall(s) in bold, if any. The minimum pressures, in most cases, are based on limited observations and may not have occurred at their peak intensity.

See also 

 1870-1879 Atlantic hurricane seasons
 Tropical cyclone observation
 Atlantic hurricane reanalysis project

Notes

References 

Atlantic Hurricane Season, 1871
 
Articles which contain graphical timelines
Atlantic